Holly Days is the second album by guitarist Denny Laine, released in 1977. It was recorded by him with fellow Wings members Paul and Linda McCartney. The album is a tribute to singer-songwriter Buddy Holly and comprises eleven cover versions of songs by Holly, most of them lesser-known.

Background 
On the four-track recorder Paul McCartney laid down the basic tracks, overdubbing each instrumental himself. Denny Laine and Linda McCartney added some instrumental parts and all three joined in on the vocals; Denny singing lead and Paul and Linda harmonising. Paul, via MPL Communications, had recently bought the publishing rights to Holly's catalogue, and – Laine told the press at the time – it was McCartney's father-in-law, John Eastman, who suggested Laine to record the album. Due to the rudimentary recording methods used to capture the "Buddy Holly style", only tracks 2 and 3 are actually in stereo.

Track listing 
Side one
 "Heartbeat" (Bob Montgomery, Norman Petty) – 2:37
 "Moondreams" (Petty) – 2:41
 "Rave On" (Sonny West, Bill Tilghman, Petty) – 1:53
 "I'm Gonna Love You Too" (Joe Mauldin, Niki Sullivan, Petty) – 2:15
 "Fool's Paradise" (Sonny Le Claire, Horace Linsley, Petty) – 2:46
 "Lonesome Tears (Instrumental)" (Buddy Holly) – 3:05

Side two
 "It's So Easy"/"Listen to Me" (Holly, Petty/Charles Hardin, Petty) – 3:47
 "Look at Me" (Petty, Holly, Jerry Allison) – 3:10
 "Take Your Time" (Holly, Petty) – 3:38
 "I'm Looking for Someone to Love (Instrumental)" (Holly, Petty) – 3:57

Personnel 

 Denny Laine – guitars, vocals
 Paul McCartney – guitars, bass guitar, piano, keyboards, synthesizers, organ, drums, drum machine, backing vocals
 Linda McCartney – keyboards, backing vocals

Production 
 Paul McCartney: producer, engineer
 Linda McCartney: photography

References

1977 albums
Denny Laine albums
Buddy Holly tribute albums
Albums produced by Paul McCartney